Bossiaea flexuosa is a species of flowering plant in the family Fabaceae and is endemic to Western Australia. It is a compact shrub with slightly flattened, zigzag branches, notched, more or less leafless cladodes, and golden yellow and red or pinkish flowers.

Description

Taxonomy and naming
Bossiaea flexuosa was first formally described in 2006 by James Henderson Ross in the journal Muelleria from specimens collected south-west of Salmon Gums in 1998. The specific epithet (flexuosa) means "zigzag", referring to the shape of the young stems.

Distribution and habitat
This bossiaea grows in deep sand in kwongan, open mallee or woodland mostly between Norseman, Hyden and Salmon Gums in the Coolgardie, Esperance Plains and  Mallee biogeographic regions of Western Australia.

Conservation status
Bossiaea flexuosa is classified as "Priority Three" by the Government of Western Australia Department of Parks and Wildlife meaning that it is poorly known and known from only a few locations but is not under imminent threat.

References

flexuosa
Eudicots of Western Australia
Plants described in 2006